The senior prom of the Holton-Arms School in Bethesda, Maryland for the 1974–75 school year is the only high school dance ever held at the White House. Held on May 31, 1975, it was generally well-received by participants.

Background

In 1975 Susan Ford, daughter of President Gerald Ford, was in her final year of classes at Holton-Arms School. At the suggestion of her classmates, she petitioned White House Chief Usher Rex Scouten that they be permitted to hold that year's senior class prom at the White House. The request was granted on several conditions. First, no expenses associated with the dance could be borne by the United States Government. Second, all attendees were required to provide their names, dates of birth, and Social Security numbers to the United States Secret Service a minimum of thirty days prior to the event. Finally, members of the band selected to perform at the prom could not have any outstanding drug charges against them. The cost of the dance, which totaled , was ultimately raised by members of the Holton-Arms School's senior class.

Event
President Ford and First Lady Betty Ford were out of town during the event.  Susan Ford planned on attending with her longtime boyfriend, Gardner Britt, but they had broken up prior to the dance; Ford went with Billy Pifer instead.  Prior to the dance, Ford and Pifer, as well as three other couples, took a cruise aboard the presidential yacht .  Other students had a pre-function at the Sulgrave Club.

The prom committee attempted to book The Beach Boys for the dance, but were unable to secure the band. Instead, two lesser-known bands were booked: Sandcastle and the Outerspace Band, the latter of which charged a  performance fee.

Seventy-four Holton-Arms seniors and their dates attended the dance. The event concluded at approximately 1:00a.m., thirty minutes later than originally scheduled. Several after-parties were organized, including one in the Executive Residence.

Legacy
Students later expressed their approval of the event; 12th grader Ned Faruqahar described the dance as "dynamite, virtual dynamite". Ford herself, however, said it was "just like any other prom". As of 2015, according to Vanity Fair, it is the only high school dance ever held at the White House in that building's history.

See also
 Presidency of Gerald Ford

References

External links
 A collection of newspaper clippings covering the prom
 Senior Prom at the White House - Ghosts of DC history blog

History of the White House
Prom
Dance events
Presidency of Gerald Ford
1975 in Washington, D.C.
May 1975 events in the United States